Rackham is French games company.

Rackham may also refer to:

People 
Arthur Rackham (1867–1939), English illustrator and painter
Bernard Rackham (1876–1964), English museum curator and writer on ceramics and stained glass
Clara Rackham (1875–1966), English politician, social reformer, and pioneering radio broadcaster
Horace Rackham (1858–1933), American philanthropist and early stockholder in the Ford motor company
John "Calico Jack" Rackham (1682–1720), English pirate
John Rackham (writer)
Melinda Rackham (born 1959), Australian networked artist and writer
Oliver Rackham (1939–2015), English botanist
Sharon Rackham (born 1974), Australian Paralympic athlete
Simon Rackham (born 1964), English composer and artist

Characters
Mazer Rackham, from Ender's Game by Orson Scott Card
Red Rackham, from the Tintin comic books by Hergé

Places 
Rackham Lane, Oxford, England
Rackham, West Sussex, England

Other 
HMS Rackham (M2722) (launched 1956), a minesweeper
Rackhams, trading name of House of Fraser
Rackham Graduate School of the University of Michigan

English-language surnames